The Oldenburg G 7 steam locomotive was a German 0-8-0 locomotive produced for the Grand Duchy of Oldenburg State Railways (Großherzoglich Oldenburgische Eisenbahn). It was an eight-coupled engine, intended for heavy goods train duties, and was based on the Prussian G 7. It had a 1,660 mm diameter boiler located 2,820 mm above the top of the rails in the plate frame, and was equipped with a single Walschaerts valve gear as well as a Lentz valve gear.  Thirteen were taken over by the Deutsche Reichsbahn, grouped into DRG Class 55.62 and given numbers 55 6201–55 6213.

See also 
Grand Duchy of Oldenburg State Railways
List of Oldenburg locomotives and railbuses
Länderbahnen

References 

 
 
 
 

0-8-0 locomotives
G 7
Standard gauge locomotives of Germany
D n2v locomotives

Freight locomotives